Bo Thao-Urabe (born 1973) is a social entrepreneur and founder and former Executive Director of the Coalition of Asian American Leaders. She was previously a member of the President’s White House Initiative on Asian Americans and Pacific Islanders under the Obama administration, and a Senior Director at Asian Americans/Pacific Islanders in Philanthropy (AAPIP). Thao-Urabe is the COO of RedGreen Rivers, a social enterprise which develops and connects women artisans in Southeast Asia to global markets, and founder of the BMPP Giving Circle, a giving circle that brings Asian American families together to fund social justice work in the Upper Midwest. She has received numerous awards and recognitions including receiving a fellowship from the Bush Foundation in 2019.

Thao-Urabe was born in Laos. Her family is Hmong and fled to Thailand after the Vietnam War. They spent three years in a refugee camp there and immigrated to the United States in 1979. She received a B.S. from the University of Minnesota and lives in Eagan, Minnesota.

References

External links
 RedGreen Rivers
 BMPP Giving Circle
 Coalition of Asian American Leaders (CAAL)

1973 births
Social entrepreneurs
American people of Hmong descent
Living people